Accrington Corporation Tramways operated a passenger tramway service in Accrington between 1907 and 1932.

History

Tramway services in Accrington had been provided by the Accrington Corporation Steam Tramways Company since 1886. Despite the name, it was independent of the corporation. On 20 September 1907, Accrington Corporation formally purchased the Accrington Corporation Steam Tramways Company for £2,227 (equivalent to £ in ).

Before the formal takeover, the corporation had started the electrification of the tramway. On 2 August 1907, a double track line to Church was opened and then a single track to Oswaldtwistle. On the day of purchase, the line to Clayton-le-Moors opened, followed a few weeks later by a line to the Cemetery at Huncoat, and then the line to Baxenden railway station.

The Baxenden line was extended to the Commercial Hotel in Haslingden on 28 September 1908 and then on 20 October to Lockgate for a connection with Rawtenstall Corporation Tramways.

Fleet
The livery for the tramcars was red and cream.
1-4 Brush 1907
5-6 Brush 1908
7-20 Brush 1907
21-23 Brush 1909
24-25 Brush 1910
26-27 Brush 1912
28-30 Brush 1919
31-32 Brush 1920
38-39 Brush 1919
40-41 Brush 1920
42-43 Brush 1926

Closure

On 30 April 1930, the tram route to Rawtenstall was closed, followed on 26 August 1931 by the routes to Clayton-le-Moors and Oswaldtwistle. The final tram ran to the Cemetery at Huncoat on 6 January 1932. Three of the 8-wheeled tramcars built by Brush in 1919-1920 saw further service on the Southend-on-Sea Corporation Tramways. They arrived there in 1934, and had to be regauged to run on the  gauge tracks. Five other cars, built by Brush in 1920–22, went on to work on the Llandudno and Colwyn Bay Electric Railway where they were also regauged to  gauge.1932.

References

Bibliography

Tram transport in England
Accrington
Historic transport in Lancashire
4 ft gauge railways in England
History of Hyndburn